You and Me is a BBC television programme for pre-school children broadcast from 1974 to 1992. The programmes consisted of various segments intended to educate and entertain young children and included elements for early literacy and numeracy. Although the programme ended in 1992, repeats of the programme continued until 1995.

Background
The first programme, called "A New House", was broadcast at 10:45am 14 January 1974 on BBC1, The series was influenced by the American series Sesame Street and the research done by the Children's Television Workshop.  It also took guidance from the analysis of children's needs in The Warnock Report, 1978.
It aimed therefore, in the jargon of the time, to be very much a "child-centred series" with an emphasis on a child's independence, enjoyment, and understanding.  Emotional and social education were held to be as important as more traditional school skills. Relationships with the presenters, who were surrogate parents and carers, were seen as central. There was an assumption that most children watching would be in the company of an adult.

Format
The series' original intention was to teach children safety, reading and emotional well-being. The show featured a mixture of human actors and puppets. In 1979, new characters were introduced which included the actor Tony Hughes as Herbert The Handyman, along with puppet characters that included Mr Bits and Pieces, a marionette made from Household objects, and Purrfecta the Cat. Herbert was portrayed as a well-meaning but inept handyman, who invariably made a hopeless mess of any odd job he was called upon to do. Although only 5 episodes of Herbert the Handyman were made, they were repeated until 1983. Episodes were also introduced by either:

 Two stop frame animations, called Alice (a hamster) and Crow.
 a puppet dragon called Duncan and humans called Vicki (Jan-Feb 1979) and later Sam (Sept 1979-Feb 1982)
 Purrfecta the Pussycat and a human called Stephen. (They only featured together in a Maths unit April–May 1980)

Cosmo and Dibs era
In January 1983, two new puppets were introduced. They were a pair of friends of an uncategorisable animal species; Cosmo, a female, from the North East of England, and Dibs, male, a Londoner, both of whom lived in a street market.

The set was based on a street market in London’s Shepherd's Bush. Each programme featured a four-minute sketch with Cosmo and Dibs on an area of child interest: sharing, eating,  arguing, bullying, sleeping, bereavement, dressing up, being silly, having a row, make-believe, making poetry – there were no limits, as long as the sketch was considered relevant and useful to the target audience.

The scripts aimed to inform, educate and entertain and see the world from a child’s point of view. Explicitly the aim was not to patronise.  A successful group of sketches dealing with ‘Safety’ included the subject of child abuse, unusual in a series for this age group.  It was welcomed by the charity Kidscape, and featured on the national news.  Songs and stories were always included, with an emphasis on cultural diversity – You and Me was one of the few programmes at the time to do this. Short documentary films covered a wealth of subjects from farming to the Notting Hill Carnival. Through their experiences in short dramas, viewers were invited to share the lives of contemporary 4- to 5-year-olds; whenever possible, the two puppets would be left without adult intervention to make their discoveries and act out every human emotion - anger, love, jealousy, greed, and fear, amongst others. For the last two series in the early 90s, the street market disappeared and was replaced by a less adventurous, more adult-controlled domestic setting, and two additional characters (Baxter and Spike) were added. Simon Buckley and Richard Coombs puppeteered and voiced the newcomers. The running time was also reduced by 5 minutes.

Production team
The first producer in the format with Cosmo and Dibs was Richard Callanan who remained with the show for three series, leaving to join schools' television at Thames TV. His place was taken by Nicci Crowther, who later developed a career as an independent producer and film maker, until her early death in 2008.  Sue Aron, Adrian Mills, Diane Morgan, Pat Farrington, Julie Callanan and Cas Lester were among the regular producers and directors.  Jill Wilson, Noreen Hunter and Hilary Hardaker were the regular production assistants.  Robert Checksfield was the studio Floor Manager who most frequently worked on the show. Assistant Floor Managers included Wendy Pedley, Garry Boon, Simone Dawson, Terry Pettigrew, Sally Bates, Christine Crow and Donna Rolfe.

The first series of twenty programmes was begun at the BBC's Lime Grove Studios, part of which overlooked Shepherd's Bush Market. It was completed at BBC Television Centre in Wood Lane, which became the show's regular home for all but the last series. Additional puppet characters joined Cosmo and Dibs for the final two seasons, and the street market disappeared in favour of a brightly coloured domestic setting.  in 1992, an independent production company, SFTV (the Production of BBC's Words and Pictures as well as the creators of CITV's The Funbox) took over and the final series of You and Me was produced by Sheila Fraser.

Presenters
The presenters who appeared were cast from a diverse range of age-groups and social and ethnic backgrounds;

Annette Badland
Michael Balfour
Jeni Barnett
Charubala Chokshi
Tony Hughes (who played the part of Herbert The Handyman)
Vicky Ireland
Joe Barton (Puppeteer and voice of Duncan the Dragon)
Isabelle Lucas
Clive Mason also joined the cast for programmes relevant to the deaf community.
 Bill Owen
 Anton Phillips
Christopher Lillicrap
Harry Towb
Frances Kay (Puppeteer and voice of Cosmo)
Michael Snelders
Maggie Ollerenshaw
 Simon Buckley (Puppeteer and voice of Baxter)
Richard Coombs (Puppeteer and voice of Spike)
Bharti Patel
Francis Wright (Puppeteer and voice of Dibs)
Larrington Walker
Gary Wilmot
Wendy Padbury (1976 - "Shapes" unit)

Puppet characters 
 Crow and Alice 
 Duncan the Dragon 
 Mr Bits-and-Pieces
 Purrfecta the Cat
 Cosmo and Dibs

Cosmo and Dibs were played by Frances Kay and Francis Wright who puppeteered and voiced the characters throughout the series. The puppets were made by Muppet-maker and performer Tim Rose, and the scripts were written by members of the production team and cast.

Henry the Kangaroo
From 1981 until 1992 the show also included a regular item featuring Henry the Kangaroo, an animated cartoon incorporating live action. The item introduced 'social sight words' such as STOP and EXIT.  Henry would say each time: 'I'm looking for the words in my book again...' His farewell line was: "Toodle-oo from the kangaroo, toodle-oo from me to you". Henry was voiced by Nigel Lambert.

Theme tune
The Theme was written by Charley Dore, Julian Littman and Karl Johnson, and was originally an acoustic version.  In 1983 it was replaced with a reggae version performed by UB40 which lasted until the series finished in 1992:

You and me, me and you,
Lots and lots for you to do,
Lots and lots for you to see,
Me and you, you and me …

The lyrics were referenced in the Oasis song "She's Electric", "Cos I'll be you and you'll be me, there's lots and lots for us to see, lots and lots for us to do".

References

External links

BBC children's television shows
British television shows for schools
1974 British television series debuts
1970s British children's television series
1980s British children's television series
1990s British children's television series
1992 British television series endings
British preschool education television series
British television shows featuring puppetry
English-language television shows